Parectopa heptametra is a moth of the family Gracillariidae. It is known from Colombia.

References

Gracillariinae
Moths described in 1915